This is a listing of the horses that finished in either first, second, or third place and the number of starters in the Safely Kept Breeders' Cup Stakes, a grade 3 American thoroughbred race for three-year-old fillies run at six furlongs on dirt at Laurel Park Racecourse in Laurel, Maryland.

See also 

 Safely Kept Stakes
 Laurel Park Racecourse
 American Champion Female Sprint Horse   
 Breeders' Cup Filly & Mare Sprint

References 

 Laurel Park Racecourse

Lists of horse racing results
Laurel Park Racecourse